This is a list of female bullfighters who are notably participating, or have in the past participated, in bullfighting. Women in bullfighting has been traced to the sport's earliest renditions in Spain, namely during the late-1700s and early-1800s. Spanish painter Francisco Goya first depicted a female bullfighter in his etching work La Pajuelera, which featured a woman sparring with a bull on horseback in 1816. During the Spanish Civil War of the 1930s, women were forced to exile in other Spanish-speaking countries and the United States in order to continue bullfighting. In Spain – along with many countries in Latin America and Asia – women were banned from the sport. They were banned from bullfighting in Spain until 1974, and in Japan until 2018.

Women had difficulty completing their alternativa, a ceremony where a bullfighter becomes a matador, during the 1980s due to the social pressures of the decade. Spanish bullfighter Cristina Sánchez was the first woman matador in Europe, gaining full status in 1996.

Female bullfighters 
 Joaquina Ariza Genir (La Algabeña)
 Maribel Atienzar
 Isabel Beniers
 Teresa Bolsi
 Conchita Cintrón
 Nicolasa Escamilla (La Pajuelera)
 Mari Fortes Roca
 Angela Hernandez
 Elena Gayral
 Blanca Inés Macías Monsalve (Rosarillo de Colombia)
 Alicia Tomás

American Female bullfighters
 Bette Ford
 Patricia McCormick

French Female bullfighters
 Léa Vicens
 Marie Sara

Mexican Female bullfighters
 Lupita López
 Hilda Tenorio

Portuguese Female bullfighters
 Sónia Matias
 Isabel Ramos
 Ana Batista
 Ana Rita 
 Joana Andrade

Spanish Female bullfighters
 Conchi Ríos
 Cristina Sánchez
 Juana Cruz
 Alicia Tomás Jiménez (1949-2021).

Swedish Female bullfighters
 Agnes von Rosen

Gallery

See also 
Bullfighting
List of bullfighters
History of women in Spanish-style bullfighting

References

External links 
 Mujer y toro 
 Mujeres toreras: más de cien actuaciones 
 Mujeres toreras de España, II, III 

 
Bullfighters